Robert Alcock may refer to:

Robert Alcock (MP) (died 1583), MP for Canterbury
Robert James Michael Alcock (born 1936), RAF commander